Hibiscus coccineus, the scarlet rosemallow, is a hardy Hibiscus species that looks much like Cannabis sativa (marijuana). It is also known as Texas star, brilliant hibiscus, and scarlet hibiscus.

The plant is found in swamps, marshes, and ditches on the coastal plain of the Southeastern United States. It is native from Southeastern Virginia south to Florida, then west to Louisiana. Despite its common name "Texas star", the plant is not found naturally in Texas. In addition to the scarlet-flowering variety, a white-flowering variety is also known as the white Texas star or lone star hibiscus.

Description 
It features bright scarlet flowers that have five petals and are reminiscent of hollyhock. These flowers are attractive to hummingbirds, butterflies, and bees, including the specialized bee Ptilothrix bombiformis. The plant prefers to be grown in full sun with moist soil. It is hardy in USDA hardiness zones 6–9. 

The Latin specific epithet coccineus means "coloured or dyed scarlet". The genus name is the old Greek and Latin name for "mallow".

References 

coccineus
Garden plants
Flora of Alabama